is a rural district in Iwate Prefecture, in the Tōhoku region of northern Japan.

As of 1 June 2019, the district had an estimated population of 5,315, and a population density of 9 persons per km2, the total area is 590.74 km2. Parts of the cities of Kitakami, Hanamaki and the town of Kanegasaki were formerly within the district. Since 2006, the district has been contiguous with just the town of Nishiwaga.

History
During the Edo period under the Tokugawa shogunate, the district was within Mutsu Province and was under the control of the Nanbu clan of Morioka Domain. In 1869, following the Meiji restoration, Mutsu Province was divided, with the area of Waga District becoming part of Rikuchū Province, and from 1872, part of Iwate Prefecture.

In 1878, with the establishment of the municipalities, Waga District was administratively divided into 69 villages. On January 4, 1879, the District was divided into Higashiwaga (62 villages) and Nishiwaga (7 villages).

However, on April 1, 1897, the two districts were merged and reorganized into one town (Kurosawajiri) and 16 villages, with the village of Aisari transferred to Isawa District.

former Higashiwaga District
 Kurosawajiri
 Sasama
 Tachibana
 Iitoyo
 Futago
 Saraki
 Oniyanagi
 Junikabura
 Nakanai
 Oyamada
 Taninai
 Iwasaki
 Yokokawame
 Fujine
 Ezuriko
 Aisari

former Nishiwaga District
 Yuda
 Sawauchi

Subsequent history
 December 25, 1940 - The village of Junikabura renamed and gained town status to become the town of Tsuchizawa. (2 towns, 15 villages)
 January 1, 1954 - The village of Tachibana merged into the town of Kurosawajiri. (2 towns, 14 villages)
 April 1, 1954 - The town of Kurosawajiri and the villages of Iitoyo, Futago, Saraki, and Oniyanagi merged with the village of Aisari from Isawa District and the village of Fukuoka from Esashi District to form the city of Kitakami. (1 town, 10 villages)
 January 1, 1955 - The town of Tsuchizawa and the villages of Nakanai, Oyamada, and Taninai merged to form the town of Tōwa. (1 town, 7 villages)
 April 1, 1955 - The villages of Iwasaki, Yokokawame, and Fujine merged to form the village of Waga. (1 town, 5 villages)
 July 1, 1955 - The village of Sasama merged into the city of Hanamaki. (1 town, 4 villages)
 April 1, 1956 - The village of Waga gained town status to become the town of Waga. (2 towns, 3 villages)
 August 1, 1964 - The village of Yuda gained town status to become the town of Yuda. (3 towns, 2 villages)
 April 1, 1991 - The towns of Waga and the village of Ezuriko merged with the city of Kitakami. (2 towns, 1 village)
 November 1, 2005 - The town of Yuda and village of Sawauchi merged to form the town of Nishiwaga. (2 town)
 January 1, 2006 - The town of Tōwa merged with the towns of Ishidoriya and Ōhasama from Hienuki District with the city of Hanamaki. (1 town)

Waga
Districts in Iwate Prefecture